The 2019 Gran Premio Bruno Beghelli was the 24th edition of the Gran Premio Bruno Beghelli road cycling one day race. It was held on 6 October 2019 as part of the 2019 UCI Europe Tour in category 1.HC, over a distance of 199.3 km, starting and ending in Monteveglio.

Teams
Twenty-five teams were invited to take part in the race. These included eleven  UCI WorldTeams, eight UCI Professional Continental teams and six UCI Continental teams.

Results

References 

Gran Premio Bruno Beghelli
Gran Premio Bruno Beghelli
Gran Premio Bruno Beghelli